This is a list of Chinese football transfers for the 2015 season winter transfer window. Super League and League One transfer window opened on 1 January 2015 and closed on 27 February 2015. League Two transfer window opened on 1 March 2015 and closed on 15 March 2015.

Super League

Beijing Guoan

In:

Out:

Changchun Yatai

In:

Out:

Chongqing Lifan

In:

 

 

 

Out:

Guangzhou Evergrande Taobao

In:

Out:

Guangzhou R&F

In:
 

Out:

Guizhou Renhe

In:

 

Out:

Hangzhou Greentown

In:

Out:

Henan Jianye

In:

Out:

Jiangsu Guoxin Sainty

In:

Out:

Liaoning Whowin

In:

Out:

Shandong Luneng Taishan

In:

 

Out:

Shanghai Greenland Shenhua

In:

Out:

Shanghai Shenxin

In:

 

Out:

Shanghai SIPG

In:

Out:

Shijiazhuang Ever Bright

In:

Out:

Tianjin Teda

In:

Out:

League One

Beijing BG

In:

 
 

Out:

Beijing BIT

In:

Out:

Dalian Aerbin

In:

Out:

Guizhou Zhicheng

In:

 

Out:

Harbin Yiteng

In:

 
 
 
 

Out:

Hebei Zhongji

In:

Out:

Hunan Billows

In:

 

Out:

Jiangxi Liansheng

In:

 

Out:

Nei Monggol Zhongyou

In:

 
 

Out:

Qingdao Hainiu

In:

Out:

Qingdao Jonoon

In:

Out:

Shenzhen F.C.

In:

Out:

Tianjin Songjiang

In:

 

Out:

Wuhan Zall

In:

Out:

Xinjiang Tianshan Leopard

In:

Out:

Yanbian Changbaishan

In:

Out:

References

2015
2015 in Chinese football
China